Elliptera is a genus of crane fly in the family Limoniidae.

Species
E. astigmatica Alexander, 1912
E. clausa Osten Sacken, 1877
E. coloradensis Alexander, 1920
E. hungarica Madarassy, 1881
E. illini Alexander, 1920
E. jacoti Alexander, 1925
E. omissa Schiner, 1863
E. tennessa Alexander, 1926
E. usingeri Alexander, 1966
E. zipanguensis Alexander, 1924

References

Limoniidae
Nematocera genera